Garrett Morgan Academy is a four-year public high school in Paterson, Passaic County, New Jersey, United States, that serves students in ninth through twelfth grades operating as part of the Paterson Public Schools. The school focuses on STEM education and operates within International High School.

As of the 2020–21 school year, the school had an enrollment of 183 students. There were 94 students (51.4% of enrollment) eligible for free lunch.

History
The school was established in 2000 by the school district and the New Jersey Community Development Corporation to focus on STEM education. Initially, the school began with 100 students and a focus on technology and transportation,

The school was named for Garrett Morgan, an African-American inventor who lived from 1877 to 1963 and invented a three-position traffic signal and a smoke hood.

Administration
Core members of the school's administration are:
Dr. Catherine Forfia-Dion, principal

References

External links
Garrett Morgan Academy
Paterson School District

School Data for the Paterson Public Schools, National Center for Education Statistics

2000 establishments in New Jersey
Education in Paterson, New Jersey
Educational institutions established in 2000
Public high schools in Passaic County, New Jersey